Bob or Robert Wilkie may refer to:

Robert Wilkie (moderator) (1548-1611) Moderator of the General Assembly of the Church of Scotland in 1600 and Principal of St Andrews University from 1591 to 1611
Bob Wilkie (footballer) (1920–2001), Australian rules footballer 
Bob Wilkie (ice hockey) (born 1969), Canadian ice hockey player
Robert Wilkie (born 1962), American lawyer and government official
Robert Wilkie (cricketer) (1878–1966), New Zealand cricketer
Robert J. Wilke (1914–1989), American actor